The 18th Sarawak State Legislative Assembly was a term of the Sarawak State Legislative Assembly, the legislative branch of the Government of Sarawak in Sarawak, Malaysia. The 18th Assembly consisted of 82 members that were elected in the 2016 state election and served from 7 June 2016 until 3 November 2021.

The legislature would, in normal circumstances, have dissolved automatically at the expiration of the five-year term on 6 June 2021 per the Sarawak constitution, but it was overridden by an ongoing emergency declaration at the federal level arising from the 2020–21 Malaysian political crisis and the COVID-19 pandemic in Malaysia. The subsequent state election has also been delayed. The emergency declaration was however ended several months earlier than scheduled and the legislature was dissolved on the same day.

Background 
Following the state election that was held on 7 May 2016, Barisan Nasional was able to form the next state government with a majority of 72 seats out of 82. There were several candidates from breakaway parties such as TERAS and UPP that had their members contest seats under the Barisan banner as direct election candidates under a deal by Adenan Satem after their parties were prevented from joining Barisan after opposition from parties such as PDP and SUPP. On 12 June 2018, all Sarawak-based BN parties including Parti Pesaka Bumiputera Bersatu (PBB), Parti Rakyat Sarawak (PRS), Progressive Democratic Party (PDP) and Sarawak United People's Party (SUPP) officially left Barisan Nasional forming a new coalition Sarawak Parties Alliance due to Barisan Nasional's defeat in general elections on 9 May 2018.

Officeholders

Speakership 
 Speaker: Mohamad Asfia Awang Nasar (non-MLA)
 Deputy Speaker: Gerawat Jala (GPS-PBB)

Other parliamentary officers 
 Secretary:
 Semawi bin Mohamad ( – 2 September 2019)
 Pele Peter Tinggom (3 September 2019 – )
 Deputy Secretary: Sharifah Shazzea binti Wan Akil
 Serjeants-at-Arms:
 Johari bin Mudin
 Ismail bin Ali
 Abang Nasiruddin bin Abang Mohamad Khalid
 Hadyan bin Abdul Rahman
 Lydwilkyn Andar Anak Umbar
 Hanimasra Bin Hamden

Party leaders 
 Chief Minister: Abang Abdul Rahman Zohari Abang Openg (Parti Pesaka Bumiputera Bersatu)
 Deputy Chief Ministers:
 Douglas Uggah Embas (Parti Pesaka Bumiputera Bersatu)
 Awang Tengah Ali Hasan (Parti Pesaka Bumiputera Bersatu)
 Leader of the Opposition: Wong Soon Koh (United Sarawak Party)
 Leader of the Democratic Action Party: Chong Chieng Jen
 Leader of the Malaysian United Indigenous Party: Ali Biju

Floor leaders 
 Leader of the House: 
 Shadow Leader of the House:

Whips 
 Government Whip:
 Opposition Whip:

Committees 
The fifth session of the 18th Assembly consists of 6 select committees:

Members

Party representation

Membership changes

List

Seating plan

Notes

References 

Sarawak State Legislative Assembly